Jacopo Cerutti (born 25 November 1989) is an Italian rally raid and Enduro rider.

Career

Cerutti began riding motocross at the age of 14, after having started his racing career with BMX. At 16 years old, Cerutti made his debut in enduro and, within three years, was already fighting for the Italian Junior Championship podium.

After winning one European and four Italian enduro awards, since 2015 Cerutti became dedicated to Rally raid. He quickly collected numerous successes in this discipline as well: a 12th-place finish at his first Dakar Rally and three first-place finished in the Italian Rally Championship, racing for Motoclub Intimiano.

In 2018, Cerutti achieved 20th place at Dakar Rally and opened the 2019 season racing with Solarys Racing.

Results

Enduro

Rally Raid

Other Rally Raids
2017: Merzouga Rally : 6th
2015: Hellas Rally Raid : 1st
2015: Rally di Sardegna : 6th
2015: OiLibya Rally : 10th

Note

1989 births
Living people
Sportspeople from the Province of Como
Dakar Rally co-drivers
Enduro riders
Italian motorcycle racers